Alois Jelen (11 May 1801, Světlá nad Sázavou – 15 October 1857, Prague) was a Czech composer, archivist and nationalist.

Biography 

He displayed musical talent at an early age, so his father, a school teacher, sent him to Prague for his primary education. His first musical lessons were provided by the composer, at St. Nicholas Church, where Jelen worked as a singer, from the age of nine. He was, however, orphaned at the age of twelve, so he was left to rely on his own personal resources and whatever patronage he could obtain. He later found a position as a tenor in the choir at the Church of Our Lady before Týn.

After completing his education, in 1824, he took a position as a civil servant with the Kingdom of Bohemia, where he was assigned to the archives and became an expert in diplomatics. As a musician, he composed solo choral songs, both sacred and secular, and worked evenings as an opera singer.

In 1840, he established the choir at the Žofínská (Sophien) Akademie and served as its choirmaster for four years. It soon became a major contributor to the promotion of Czech culture.

He became heavily involved in the Czech National Revival, and was active during the Revolutions of 1848. That same year, he stood as a candidate in the Cisleithanian legislative election and was elected to the Imperial Diet, representing the Vlašim constituency. In 1849, he was appointed Director of the archives at the Ministry of the Interior, and moved to Vienna with his family. He would, however, continue to be a regular visitor to Prague.

During one of those trips, he died suddenly and was buried in the Prague 20 district. In 1887, his remains were transferred to Prague-East District and interred with his daughter-in-law's family (Chourových). 

A street is named after him, near his birthplace.

References 

 Biography @ Osobnosti

Further reading 
 Ottův slovník naučný, heslo Jelen, Alois. Sv. 13, str. 198

External links 

 List of works about Jelen @ Souborný katalog České republiky

1801 births
1857 deaths
People from Světlá nad Sázavou
People from the Kingdom of Bohemia
Old Czech Party politicians
Members of the Imperial Diet (Austria)
Czech composers
Czech archivists
Czech choral conductors
Czech civil servants